A military airfield in Belbek, a village near Sevastopol, Crimea, was also used for civil aviation, named Sevastopol International Airport Belbek , for six years from 2002 to 2007 under Ukrainian administration.

Since 2014, following the start of the Russo-Ukrainian War and the annexation of Crimea by Russia, the base has been operated by the Russian Ministry of Defence. In 2017 plans were published under Russian administration to restore the airfield into an international airport by 2020, but this did not happen.

The base is home to the 38th Fighter Aviation Regiment which flies the Sukhoi Su-27 and Sukhoi Su-30 under the 27th Composite Aviation Division part of the 4th Air and Air Defence Forces Army.

History

Military airfield since 1941

The airfield is located next to the coast, in the  Nakhimovsky area of Sevastopol, north of the city center, close to the adjacent neighborhood Lyubimovka. The airfield was first constructed by the Soviet Union in June 1941, during the third year of World War II. Initially it housed a military fighter aviation unit. Constructed without a hardened runway, a concrete runway was constructed after the war.

During the second half of the 1980s, after Mikhail Gorbachev came to power, the Soviet airfield was significantly increased and improved, as the airfield was to be used by him when travelling to the presidential dacha on the southern coast of the Crimea, near the cape of Foros. The name of the airport comes from the Belbek river, in the south-west of Crimea.

After Ukrainian independence in 1991 the airfield was under Ukrainian military control, with concomitant use as a civilian airport for a few years.

After Crimea was annexed by Russia in 2014, the Sevastopol transportation authorities said that Belbek airport was used for civilian charter flights from Ukraine and Russia.

2002–2007: International airport 
From July 2002, the airfield began to be used for civil aviation. In December 2002, the airport received a license for international flights. Between 2002 and 2007 over 2,500 flights were carried out, which transported about 25,000 passengers. During 2007, civil flights were suspended again. In spring 2009 it was announced that resumption of air links was to commence in the near future, but this did not happen.

Ukrainian military use of the airfield as a fighter airbase continued alongside its civilian use. In 1996 the Su-15TM aircraft based there were replaced by the Su-27, and until 2014 the 204th Tactical Aviation Brigade flying the MiG-29 was based there.

Russian military control
On 28 February 2014, Ukraine's acting Interior Minister Arsen Avakov said that that the airport had been blocked by Russian Military personnel, and unidentified armed men were patrolling the area. He said through his Twitter account that, "I can only describe this as a military invasion and occupation". 
Neither the Russian Foreign Ministry nor the Russian defense ministry responded to requests for comment.

11 March 2014, a website was established by the military personnel to report directly on current and former events in the airfield. According to the website, there had been a fire at the airfield in military area (воинская часть, Military Unit Number, А-4515) where electrical equipment was stored, with some unknown soldiers guarding it. The site was updated several times, and discontinued in 2016.

14 March 2014, Ukrainian Colonel Yuliy Mamchur made an appeal on YouTube to the Ukraine government, requesting written orders to all the Ukrainian troops on the Crimean peninsula. If he did not receive the orders, he said that the 204th tactical brigade was going to fight, even if facing likely defeat.

The 204th tactical brigade had been deployed in Belbek since December 2007 in the military area number A4515 (воинская часть A-4515).

After 2014, a 38th fighter regiment of the Russian 27th Mixed Aviation Division, flying Su-27s and Su-30s, was established at Belbek, but relocated to Russia after explosions in August 2022.

The 23rd Fighter Aviation Regiment (23 IAP) from Dzyomgi Airport of the Russian Air Force were deployed here from April 2022 flying the Sukhoi Su-35S.

On 1 Oct 2022 an explosion was reported which Russian news agency TASS reported as due to an aircraft which ran off the runway while landing, without damaging the airfield.

Renovation plans
In January 2017, the company managing the airport presented public plans to open a new temporary terminal with a capacity of 300,000 - 400,000 passengers by 2018, with a full-size terminal to follow by 2019 or 2020.  In the event, the plans were not carried out.

Airlines and destinations 
As of 2015, there were no scheduled flights to or from the airport.

See also 
 List of the busiest airports in the former USSR
 Simferopol International Airport

References

Notes 

Airports in Sevastopol
Airports built in the Soviet Union
Soviet Air Force bases
Buildings and structures in Sevastopol